The canton of Romans-sur-Isère is an administrative division of the Drôme department, southeastern France. It was created at the French canton reorganisation which came into effect in March 2015. Its seat is in Romans-sur-Isère.

It consists of the following communes:
 
Châtillon-Saint-Jean
Clérieux
Génissieux
Mours-Saint-Eusèbe
Peyrins
Romans-sur-Isère (partly)
Saint-Bardoux
Saint-Paul-lès-Romans
Triors

References

Cantons of Drôme